The 48th edition of the annual Clásico RCN was held from October 19 to October 26, 2008, in Colombia. The stage race with an UCI rate of 2.3 started with a time trial on the island San Andrés and finished in Cali.

Stages

2008-10-19: San Andrés – San Andrés (30.9 km)

2008-10-19: Circuito en San Andrés (90 km)

2008-10-20: Zipaquirá – Arcabuco (168 km)

2008-10-21: Ventaquemada – Girardot (238.9 km)

2008-10-22: Girardot – Armenia (162.2 km)

2008-10-23: Santa Rosa de Cabal – Bello (206.8 km)

2008-10-24: Sabaneta – Manizales (177.2 km)

2008-10-25: Manizales – Buga (223.3 km)

2008-10-26: Palmira – Cali (35.7 km)

Final classification

See also 
 2008 Vuelta a Colombia

References 
 Clásico RCN 2008
 cyclingwebsite
 pedalear

Clásico RCN
Clasico RCN
Cycling